Wat Bowon Sathan Sutthawat is a  Thai temple in Bangkok. It's a historic temple in the area of the Front Palace, similar to Wat Phra Kaew inside the Grand Palace. Because the temple is situated in a palace, no monks live inside it. The temple is located at 4 Rachini Road, Phra Borom Maha Ratchawang Subdistrict, Phra Nakhon District, Bangkok within Bunditpatanasilpa Institute in front of foot of Phra Pinklao Bridge opposite the entrance of Soi Rambuttri near Tha Chang Wang Na and Bangkok Tourism Division, Culture, Sports and Tourism Department, next to the National Theater. This temple is also known as Wat Phra Kaew Wang Na (วัดพระแก้ววังหน้า; literally: "Temple of the Emerald Buddha at Front Palace").

Wat Bowon Sathan Sutthawat was built by Prince Sakdiphonlasep,  viceroy of King Nangklao (Rama III) in the early Rattanakosin era, but it was not finished in his lifetime. The temple was completed in the reign of King Mongkut (Rama IV). The mural in the interior depicts the legend of the Phra Phuttha Sihing Buddha image and the lives of the 28 Buddhas.

The interior of the ubosot (ordination hall) contains traditional Thai-style murals. Currently the temple is not in use as a traditional religious site and is little known to the public. The Fine Arts Department often uses the ubosot for rituals such as wai khru (teacher appreciation ritual), krob khru (teacher initiation ritual), and other sacred ceremonies to do with traditional dance and musical artists.

References 

Buddhist temples in Bangkok
Phra Nakhon district
Thai Theravada Buddhist temples and monasteries
Front Palace